Albert C. Comstock (September 20, 1845 in Lansingburgh, Rensselaer County, New York – November 14, 1910) was an American lawyer and politician from New York.

Life
He was the son of James C. Comstock (born 1819). He attended the public schools and Lansingburgh Academy. Then he studied law, was admitted to the bar in 1867, and practiced. On August 11, 1869, he married Mary E. Benson (1838–1929).

Comstock was a member of the New York State Assembly (Rensselaer Co., 2nd D.) in 1880.

He was a member of the New York State Senate (16th D.) from 1884 to 1887, sitting in the 107th, 108th, 109th and 110th New York State Legislatures.

In 1895, he was elected Surrogate of Rensselaer County.

Sources
 The New York Red Book compiled by Edgar L. Murlin (published by James B. Lyon, Albany NY, 1897; pg. 403, 500 and 782)
 Biographical sketches of the Members of the Legislature in The Evening Journal Almanac (1885)
 Benson genealogy

External links

1845 births
1910 deaths
Republican Party New York (state) state senators
People from Lansingburgh, New York
Republican Party members of the New York State Assembly
New York (state) state court judges
19th-century American judges